Implementability may refer to:

Implementability (mechanism design)
Implementability (medicine)

See also
Implementation